is a passenger railway station located in the city of Kazo, Saitama, Japan, operated by the private railway operator Tōbu Railway.

Lines
Hanasaki Station is served by the Tōbu Isesaki Line, and is located 54.8 km from the Tokyo terminus at

Station layout
This station has an elevated station building, with two opposed side platforms serving two tracks located on the ground level.

Platforms

Adjacent stations

History
Hanasaki Station opened on 1 April 1927.

From 17 March 2012, station numbering was introduced on all Tōbu lines, with Hanasaki Station becoming "TI-04".

Passenger statistics
In fiscal 2019, the station was used by an average of 10,682 passengers daily.

Surrounding area
 Hanasaki Ekimae Post Office
 Satoe Memorial Art Museum of 21st Century
 Heisei International University
 Hanasaki Tokuei High School

References

External links

 Hanasaki Station information (Tobu) 

Tobu Isesaki Line
Stations of Tobu Railway
Railway stations in Saitama Prefecture
Railway stations in Japan opened in 1927
Kazo, Saitama